These are the official results of the Men's 400 metres Hurdles event at the 1999 IAAF World Championships in Seville, Spain. There were a total number of 50 participating athletes, with seven qualifying heats, two semi-finals and the final held on Friday, 27 August 1999 at 21:00.

Final

Semi-finals
Held on Wednesday 1999-08-25

Qualifying heats
Held on Tuesday 1999-08-24

See also
 1996 Men's Olympic 400m Hurdles (Atlanta)
 1998 Men's European Championships 400m Hurdles (Budapest)
 2000 Men's Olympic 400m Hurdles (Sydney)
 2002 Men's European Championships 400m Hurdles (Munich)

References
 Results

H
400 metres hurdles at the World Athletics Championships